Pawan Negi  (born 6 January 1993) is an Indian cricketer. He is a slow left-arm orthodox bowler. He was born in Uttarakhand.

Career 
Negi plays for Delhi in domestic cricket. He played for Delhi Daredevils in the Indian Premier League in 2012 and 2013 and for Chennai Super Kings in 2014 and 2015 before rejoining Delhi for the 2016 season.

Negi made his Twenty20 International debut for India national cricket team against the United Arab Emirates in the 2016 Asia Cup at Sher-e-Bangla National Stadium on 3 March 2016. He was picked in the Indian squad for ICC T20 World Cup 2016. To date this is his only international cap.

In February 2017, he was bought by Royal Challengers Bangalore ahead of the 2017 Indian Premier League and played for the side between 2017 and 2019. In February 2021, he was bought by Kolkata Knight Riders ahead of the 2021 Indian Premier League but did not play a match in the competition. KKR bought him at his base price of 50 lakhs for IPL 2021.

References

1993 births
Living people
Cricketers from Delhi
Indian cricketers
India Twenty20 International cricketers
Delhi cricketers
India Green cricketers
Royal Challengers Bangalore cricketers
Delhi Capitals cricketers
Kolkata Knight Riders cricketers
Chennai Super Kings cricketers
Legends of Rupganj cricketers